Mauricio Igor Rodrigues Martins (born 8 February 1993), commonly known as Mauricio is a Brazilian professional football player who played as a left sided fullback.

Club career
In January 2014 he went on trial with Wisla Krakow, before moving to KF Elbasani.

Honours
KF Elbasani
Albanian First Division (1): 2013-14

References

External links
Maurício Martins at ZeroZero

1993 births
Sportspeople from Minas Gerais
Living people
Brazilian footballers
Brazilian expatriate footballers
Association football defenders
Kategoria e Parë players
Kategoria Superiore players
Campeonato de Portugal (league) players
São Carlos Futebol Clube players
KF Tërbuni Pukë players
KF Elbasani players
ŁKS Łódź players
R.D. Águeda players
S.U. Sintrense players
AD Oliveirense players
F.C. Felgueiras 1932 players
Expatriate footballers in Albania
Expatriate footballers in Poland
Expatriate footballers in Portugal
Brazilian expatriate sportspeople in Albania
Brazilian expatriate sportspeople in Poland
Brazilian expatriate sportspeople in Portugal